The Hamarglovene Crevasses are a crevasse field in lower Vestreskorve Glacier just east of Hamaroya Mountain, in the Mühlig-Hofmann Mountains of Queen Maud Land, Antarctica. They were mapped from surveys and air photos by the Sixth Norwegian Antarctic Expedition (1956–60) and named Hamarglovene (the hammer clefts).

References

Crevasse fields of Queen Maud Land
Princess Astrid Coast